Tamako Market is a 2013 anime television series produced by Kyoto Animation and directed by Naoko Yamada. The series revolved around Tamako Kitashirakawa, the elder daughter of a mochi shop owner in the Usagiyama Shopping District, who one day encounters a talking bird named Dera. The series aired in Japan between January 10 and March 28, 2013. The anime has been licensed in North America by Sentai Filmworks and it is streamed on the Anime Network. An animated film, Tamako Love Story, was released in Japanese theaters on April 26, 2014.


Episode list

Bonus episodes
The following episodes are included on DVD/Blu-ray Disc volumes.

Tamako Love Story (2014)

Notes

References

Tamako Market